The Howrah–Gaya–Delhi is a railway line connecting  and Delhi cutting across Indo-Gangetic Plain and a comparatively small stretch of the line crossing over the Chota Nagpur Plateau. The Grand Chord is a part of this line and as such is referred to by many as Howrah–Delhi line (via Grand Chord).

Sections
 Howrah–Bardhaman chord
Bardhaman–Asansol section
Asansol–Gaya section
Gaya–Mughalsarai section
Mughalsarai–Kanpur section
Kanpur–Delhi section

History
Construction of a line from Howrah to Sahibganj, for the proposed Howrah–Delhi link, started in 1851. The first Howrah–Delhi line via what later became the Sahibganj loop was opened in 1866. With the completion of the Raniganj-Kiul section, the shorter Howrah–Delhi main line via Patna was in place in 1871. The Sitarampur–Gaya–Mughalsarai Grand Chord, which shortened the Howrah–Delhi distance even further, was completed in 1901 but was formally inaugurated by Lord Minto, then Viceroy and Governor General of India with a function on 6 December 1906.

Electrification
Howrah–Bardhaman chord was electrified in 1964–66. The Bardhaman–Mankar–Waria sector in 1964–66,  the Waria–Asansol sector in 1960−61, the Asansol to Gaya sector in 1960–62, the Gaya–Mughalsarai sector in 1962, the Mughalsarai–Kanpur sector in 1964–69 and the Kanpur–New Delhi sector in 1966–1977.

The Howrah–Gaya–Delhi route was the first trunk route in India to be completely electrified (AC traction).

In 1965, Asansol–Bareilly Passenger was the first long-distance train on Eastern Railway to be hauled by an AC loco.

Speed limits
Most of the Howrah–Gaya–Delhi line is classified as ‘A’ class line where trains can run up to 160 km per hour but in certain sections speeds may be limited to 120–130 km per hour.  The Howrah Rajdhani (between Howrah and New Delhi) travels at an average speed of 85.8 km per hour and the Sealdah Rajdhani (between Sealdah and New Delhi) travels at an average speed of 82.70 km per hour.

The Rajdhani Express ran for the first time in 1969 from New Delhi to Howrah. It took 17 hours 20 minutes to cover the distance of 1,445 km.

The first Duronto non-stop express was launched on 18 September 2009, between Sealdah and New Delhi. It was followed by several such trains between other stations.

The first double-decker superfast train commenced running between Howrah and Dhanbad on 1 October 1970.

Passenger movement

Railway reorganisation
In 1952, Eastern Railway,  Northern Railway and North Eastern Railway were formed. Eastern Railway was formed with a portion of East Indian Railway Company, east of Mughalsarai and Bengal Nagpur Railway. Northern Railway was formed with a portion of East Indian Railway Company west of Mughalsarai, Jodhpur Railway, Bikaner Railway and Eastern Punjab Railway. North Eastern Railway was formed with Oudh and Tirhut Railway, Assam Railway and a portion of Bombay, Baroda and Central India Railway. East Central Railway was created in 1996–97. North Central Railway was formed in 2003.

Golden quadrilateral
The Howrah–Gaya–Delhi line is a part of the golden quadrilateral. The routes connecting the four major metropolises (New Delhi, Mumbai, Chennai and Kolkata), along with their diagonals, known as the golden quadrilateral, carry about half the freight and nearly half the passenger traffic, although they form only 16 per cent of the length.

See also
 NH 19 linking Delhi and Kolkata

References

External links
Trains at New Delhi
Trains at Kanpur Central
Trains at Allahabad
Trains at Mughal Sarai
Trains at Gaya
Trains at Dhanbad
Trains at Howrah

|

5 ft 6 in gauge railways in India
Railway lines opened in 1906
Rail transport in Delhi
Rail transport in Howrah
Transport in Gaya, India
Transport in Delhi
Rail transport in Uttar Pradesh
Rail transport in Bihar
Rail transport in Jharkhand
Rail transport in West Bengal

1906 establishments in India